Maria Benedicta Chigbolu (born 27 July 1989) is an Italian sprinter, who specializes in the 400 metres. She competed at the 2020 Summer Olympics, in 4 × 400 m relay.

Biography
Maria Chigbolu was born in Rome to an Italian mother and a Nigerian father. She has five siblings. Her grandfather Julius Chigbolu was a Nigerian athlete, who competed at the 1956 Summer Olympics, and later became president of Athletics Federation of Nigeria. She is engaged with the Italian sprinter Matteo Galvan.

Career
Besides medals in the 400 metres and 4x400 m relays from the 2013 and 2018 Mediterranean Games, Chigbolu won a bronze in the individual event at the 2016 European Championships.

She was a member of the 2016 Olympics squad, which set the Italian national record at the 4x400 metres with a time of 3:25.16 sec.

Chigbolu took bronze medals at the 2019 World Relays (4x400 m), and at the 2019 European Team Championships (400 m and 4x400 m).

At the Italian Championships, she won 1 time in the 400 metres (2017), 8 times in the 4x400 m relay, and twice in the indoor relays (4x200 m, 4x400 m).

Achievements

International competitions

National individual competitions
 Italian Championships
 400 m: (1) 2017

See also
 Italian all-time lists - 400 metres
 Italian national track relay team

References

External links
 

1989 births
Living people
Athletes from Rome
Italian people of Nigerian descent
Italian sportspeople of African descent
Athletics competitors of Gruppo Sportivo Esercito
Italian female sprinters
World Athletics Championships athletes for Italy
Athletes (track and field) at the 2016 Summer Olympics
Olympic athletes of Italy
European Athletics Championships medalists
Mediterranean Games gold medalists for Italy
Mediterranean Games silver medalists for Italy
Athletes (track and field) at the 2013 Mediterranean Games
Athletes (track and field) at the 2018 Mediterranean Games
Mediterranean Games medalists in athletics
Athletes (track and field) at the 2020 Summer Olympics
Olympic female sprinters